The 1898 Holy Cross football team was an American football team that represented the College of the Holy Cross as an independent in the 1898 college football season.

In its first year under head coach Maurice Connor, the team compiled a 5–4–1 record. M.J. McDonough was the team captain. John Corbett served as interim head coach for the season's first game, a win.

Holy Cross played its home games at two off-campus fields in Worcester, Massachusetts, the Worcester Oval and the Worcester College Grounds.

Schedule

References

Holy Cross
Holy Cross Crusaders football seasons
Holy Cross football